Rising Sons was an American, Los Angeles, California-based blues rock and folk music band, which was founded in 1965. Their initial career was short-lived, but the group found retrospective fame for launching the careers of singer Taj Mahal and guitarist Ry Cooder.

History
The original lineup was a 17-year-old Ry Cooder (vocals, six- and 12-string guitar, mandolin, slide and bottleneck guitar, dobro), Taj Mahal (vocals, harmonica, guitar, piano), Gary Marker (bass), Jesse Lee Kincaid (born Nick Gerlach, vocals and guitar) and Ed Cassidy (drums). Cassidy left in 1965 after injuring his wrist playing a monumental version of "Statesboro Blues" with the band. He was replaced by Kevin Kelley.

The group often played at the Los Angeles clubs The Troubadour and The Ash Grove (which burned down in 1973 and was not rebuilt). They were signed by Columbia Records. Their only album, produced by Terry Melcher, was not issued at the time. One single, "Candy Man" backed with "The Devil's Got My Woman", was released. The group disbanded in 1966. They were contemporaries of the famous Los Angeles band The Byrds; fans wondered which band would be the bigger success, until the Byrds' album Mr. Tambourine Man became a hit. Recordings by Rising Sons were widely bootlegged and nearly three decades later were released by Columbia Records under the title Rising Sons Featuring Taj Mahal and Ry Cooder (1992). "We were the problem," remembered Marker later. "We had difficulties distilling our multiple musical agendas down to a product that would sell. We had no actual leader, no clear musical vision.... I think [Melcher] went out of his way to make us happy – within the scope of his knowledge. He tried just about everything he could, including the live, acoustic session that produced '2:10 Train.'"

After Rising Sons
Mahal went on to become a prominent solo blues and folk performer. Cooder and Marker played with Captain Beefheart and his Magic Band. Cooder went on to become a prominent session musician, recorded numerous albums under his own name, and scored several soundtracks. Kincaid attended the  California Institute of the Arts on a classical guitar scholarship and left the United States for six years in Europe. His music album, Brief Moments Full Measure, and his book, Ibiza Chronicles, were released in 2014. He currently resides in Mill Valley, California. Cassidy founded the band Spirit. Kelley became a member of his cousin Chris Hillman's band The Byrds in 1968, playing on their seminal album Sweetheart of the Rodeo.

Marker retired from the music industry but maintained an active interest (especially in Beefheart-related matters) until he died of a stroke, on December 8, 2015, at the age of 72.

Influence
According to AllMusic, Rising Sons' "languid, bluesy, folksy sort of sound anticipated future recordings by outfits like Moby Grape, Buffalo Springfield, the Grateful Dead, and even the southern rock Allman Brothers, and the country-rock Byrds."

Discography

Singles
 "Candy Man" b/w "The Devil's Got My Woman" (recorded 1965, 45RPM single released 1966, Columbia 4-43534)

Albums
 Rising Sons Featuring Taj Mahal and Ry Cooder (recorded 1965–1966, CD released 1992, Columbia/Legacy CK-52828)

References

Rock music groups from California
Musical groups from Los Angeles
Musical groups established in 1964